Tatta Pani is a settlement in Pakistani-administered Kashmir.

References

Populated places in Poonch District, Pakistan